William Edward Barnard  (29 January 1886 – 12 March 1958) was a New Zealand lawyer, politician and parliamentary speaker. He was a member of Parliament from 1928 until 1943, and was its Speaker from 1936 till 1943. He was known for his association with John A. Lee, a prominent left-wing politician.

Early life

Barnard was born in Carterton, a town in the Wairarapa region. He studied law at Victoria University College, and became a lawyer in 1908. He eventually settled in Te Aroha, where he served on the borough council. In 1915, he travelled to the United Kingdom and joined the Royal Army Medical Corps to serve in World War I. After serving for a time in Egypt, he became a gunner in the Royal Field Artillery, serving in Palestine. Following World War I, he returned to New Zealand and resumed practice as a lawyer.

Parliamentary career

Becoming increasingly interested in left-wing politics, Barnard joined the young Labour Party in 1923. He was a good friend of John A. Lee, one of the more radical members of the Labour Party. Barnard rose quickly, being elected to the Labour Party's national executive in 1924. In the 1925 election, he was Labour's candidate in the Kaipara seat – the incumbent was Gordon Coates, the Prime Minister, and Barnard was unsuccessful. In the 1928 elections, he stood in the seat of Napier, and narrowly defeated the incumbent Reform Party MP.

In 1935, he was awarded the King George V Silver Jubilee Medal.

In the 1935 election, he was returned with a comfortable majority, perhaps assisted by his work in response to the Napier earthquake. When the Labour Party won power in 1935, many believed that he would be appointed Minister of Justice. In the end, however, this position was given to Rex Mason. Instead, Barnard was nominated as Speaker of the House. He was elected to this position in March 1936.

Politically, Barnard was on the left of the Labour Party, and was strongly influenced by the social credit theory of monetary reform. He was also a strong Anglican, and considered himself to be a Christian socialist. Barnard became known as one of the senior members of the left-leaning, creditist faction of the party, although his old friend John A. Lee was the faction's de facto leader. As Lee's relationship with the Labour Party leadership deteriorated, Barnard sided with Lee. Lee was eventually expelled, and after Peter Fraser, an opponent of Lee, was elected leader on 4 April 1940, Barnard himself resigned from the party.

Barnard then assisted Lee in the launch of the new Democratic Labour Party, becoming one of its two MPs. Despite his departure from the governing party, he retained the office of Speaker. Soon, however, Barnard became dissatisfied with Lee's style of leadership, considering it to be egotistical and autocratic. Rather than seek re-election as a Democratic Labour Party candidate, he opted to stand as an independent, but was defeated.

Later life

Following his departure from Parliament, Barnard returned to law, setting up a legal practice in Tauranga. In 1950, he became mayor, serving for two years. He also undertook considerable work with various non-profit organisations, including the Society for Closer Relations with the USSR (Russia), the Institute of Pacific Relations's New Zealand branch, the New Zealand Five Million Club (promoting population growth), and the New Zealand Council for the Adoption of Chinese Refugee Children. For the latter, he was awarded the Order of the Brilliant Star by the government of the Republic of China. In 1953, he was awarded the Queen Elizabeth II Coronation Medal. In the 1957 New Year Honours, he was appointed a Commander of the Order of the British Empire, for political and public services.

Barnard died in Auckland on 12 March 1958.

References

Further reading

New Zealand Labour Party MPs
Independent MPs of New Zealand
New Zealand Commanders of the Order of the British Empire
Speakers of the New Zealand House of Representatives
New Zealand MPs for North Island electorates
20th-century New Zealand lawyers
British Army personnel of World War I
Victoria University of Wellington alumni
People from Carterton, New Zealand
Mayors of Tauranga
1886 births
1958 deaths
Democratic Labour Party (New Zealand) politicians
Members of the New Zealand House of Representatives
Unsuccessful candidates in the 1943 New Zealand general election
Unsuccessful candidates in the 1925 New Zealand general election
Royal Army Medical Corps soldiers
Royal Field Artillery soldiers